Limeulia is a genus of moths belonging to the family Tortricidae.

Species
Limeulia cimoliochroa Razowski & Becker, 2011
Limeulia curiosa Razowski & Becker, 2000

See also
List of Tortricidae genera

References

 , 2005, World Catalogue of Insects 5
 , 2000: Description of six Brazilian genera of Euliini and their species (Lepidoptera: Tortricidae). Shilap Revista de Lepidopterologia 28: 385-393.
 , 2011: New species of Hynhamia Razowski and other genera close to Toreulia Razowski & Becker (Lepidoptera: Tortricidae). Polish Journal of Entomology 80 (1): 53-82. Full article: .

External links
tortricidae.com

Euliini
Tortricidae genera